Lauren Rauck Komanski (born June 17, 1985) is an American former road cyclist. She attended Columbia University, where she was an NCAA Division I track and cross-country runner. She took up cycle racing in 2012, winning the first bike race she entered. She initially combined racing and training with a career in veterinary medicine before focusing fully on cycling from 2014.

Major results

2015
 1st Stage 1 (TTT) Women's Tour of New Zealand
 1st Stage 7 Tour Cycliste Féminin International de l'Ardèche
 3rd Overall Tour of California
 3rd Winston-Salem Cycling Classic

References

External links

1985 births
Living people
American female cyclists
American veterinarians
21st-century American women